NGC 637 is an open cluster of stars in the northern constellation of Cassiopeia, positioned about 1.5° to the WNW of the star Epsilon Cassiopeiae. The cluster was discovered on 9 November 1787 by German-born English astronomer William Herschel. The cluster is small but compact, and is readily visible in a small telescope.

This is a young cluster with an estimated age of 5–15 million years. It has a Trumpler class of I2m, indicating it is strongly concentrated (I) with an intermediate range of brightness variation (2) and a moderate richness of stars (m).

The seven brightest members are all over 10th magnitude, with five known to be variable. A total of four β Cephei-type variables have been identified, one of the highest such totals for an open cluster. A classical Be star candidate has been detected. The distribution of the cluster's stars on the Hertzsprung–Russell diagram shows a noticeable gap on the main sequence, which is not explained by missing data.

References

External links 
 
 SEDS

Open clusters
0637
Cassiopeia (constellation)
Discoveries by William Herschel
Astronomical objects discovered in 1787